Bradyrhizobium oligotrophicum is a nitrogen-fixing bacteria from the genus of Bradyrhizobium which was isolated from rice paddy soil in Miyagi Prefecture in Japan.

References

Further reading

External links
Type strain of Bradyrhizobium oligotrophicum at BacDive -  the Bacterial Diversity Metadatabase

Nitrobacteraceae
Bacteria described in 2013